Cieklin is a village in the administrative district of Gmina Dębowiec, within Jasło County, Subcarpathian Voivodeship, in south-eastern Poland.

The village has an approximate population of 1,200. It was founded in the 13th century. It has a museum of skiing, and has been claimed to be the birthplace of skiing in Poland, the local history of the sport going back to the 19th century.

References

Cieklin